In anatomy, the venae cavae (singular: vena cava) are two large veins (great vessels) that return deoxygenated blood from the body into the heart. In humans they are the superior vena cava and the inferior vena cava, and both empty into the right atrium. They are located slightly off-center, toward the right side of the body.

The right atrium receives deoxygenated blood through coronary sinus and two large veins called venae cavae. The inferior vena cava (or caudal vena cava in some animals) travels up alongside the abdominal aorta with blood from the lower part of the body. It is the largest vein in the human body.

The superior vena cava (or cranial vena cava in animals) is above the heart, and forms from a convergence of the left and right brachiocephalic veins, which contain blood from the head and the arms.

References 

Veins